Artem Serhiyovych Mylchenko (born 22 July 2000) is a Ukrainian professional footballer who plays as a central midfielder for Ukrainian club Lviv.

References

External links
 
 

2000 births
Living people
People from Horishni Plavni
Ukrainian footballers
Association football midfielders
FC Dynamo Kyiv players
FC Zorya Luhansk players
FC Hirnyk-Sport Horishni Plavni players
FC Lviv players
Ukrainian Premier League players
Ukrainian First League players
Sportspeople from Poltava Oblast